Best of Elissa is the first official greatest hits album by Lebanese pop singer Elissa, released by Rotana on 12 April 2011. The compilation features singles from her Rotana albums Ahla Dounya (2004), Bastanak (2006), Ayami Bik (2007) and Tesada'a Bemeen (2009).

Track listing

References

Elissa (singer) compilation albums
Rotana Records albums
2011 greatest hits albums